Dray Sáp is a commune (xã) in Krông Ana District, Đắk Lắk Province, Vietnam.

Economy

An agricultural commune, it produces rice, coffee and pepper. The Buon Kuop hydropower plant in the commune has a capacity of 280MW. There are two waterfalls that flow through the commune, including the Gia Long and Dray Sap waterfalls which attract tourists.

References

Communes of Đắk Lắk province
Populated places in Đắk Lắk province